James Smith was an American college football coach. He served as the head coach at Loyola College of Los Angeles—now known as Loyola Marymount University—in 1922. He led Loyola to a 3–4–1 record.

A native of Los Angeles, California, Smith attended Los Angeles High School. He attended college at the University of Southern California, where he played on the USC Trojans football team as a right end.

Head coaching record

References

Year of birth missing
Year of death missing
American football ends
Loyola Lions football coaches
USC Trojans football players
Sports coaches from Los Angeles
Players of American football from Los Angeles
Coaches of American football from California